Whitewood Creek is a stream in Butte, Meade and Lawrence counties, in the U.S. state of South Dakota.

Whitewood Creek was named from the white-barked quaking aspen trees along its banks.

See also
List of rivers of South Dakota

References

Rivers of Butte County, South Dakota
Rivers of Lawrence County, South Dakota
Rivers of Meade County, South Dakota
Rivers of South Dakota